The Max Planck Institute for Plasma Physics (IPP) is a physics institute investigating the physical foundations of a fusion power plant. 
The IPP is an institute of the Max Planck Society, part of the European Atomic Energy Community, and an associated member of the Helmholtz Association.

The IPP has two sites: Garching near Munich (founded 1960) and Greifswald (founded 1994), both in Germany.

It owns several large devices, namely
 the experimental tokamak ASDEX Upgrade (in operation since 1991) 
 the experimental stellarator Wendelstein 7-X (in operation since 2016)
 a tandem accelerator
 a high heat flux test facility (GLADIS)

Furthermore it cooperates closely with the ITER, DEMO and JET projects.

Scientific divisions 

 Tokamak Scenario Development
 Plasma Edge and Wall
 Stellarator Heating and Optimization
 Stellarator Dynamics and Transport
 Stellarator Edge and Divertor Physics
 Wendelstein 7-X Operations
 Stellarator Theory
 Tokamak Theory
 Numerical Methods in Plasma Physics
 ITER Technology & Diagnostics
 Young Investigators

Graduate program 
The International Helmholtz Graduate School for Plasma Physics partners with the Technical University of Munich (TUM) and the University of Greifswald. Associated partners are the Leibniz Institute for Plasma Science and Technology (INP) in Greifswald and the Leibniz Computational Center (LRZ) in Garching.

External links

References 

Fusion power
Plasma physics facilities
Physics institutes
Plasma Physics
University of Greifswald
Garching bei München
Max Planck